At the 1904 Summer Olympics, seven cycling events were contested.

It was the only time distances based on the mile were used to determine the length of events.

Medal summary

Participating nations
18 American cyclists competed at the 1904 Summer Olympics.

Medal table

References

 Sports reference on cycling at the 1904 Olympics

 
1904 Summer Olympics events
1904
1904 in cycle racing
1904 in track cycling